Below is a list of Missouri state high school girls basketball championships sanctioned by the Missouri State High School Activities Association since the organization began holding the tournaments in 1973. Girls basketball in Missouri started as early as the 1920s, but was played by schools mostly in the rural areas north of current U.S. Route 36. Few if any schools in the larger metro areas or central and southern Missouri schools offered organized basketball for girls until many decades later. A series of regional tournaments were held in Monroe City, Missouri from 1927 to 1933. Considering the lack of girls basketball elsewhere, these regional tournament winners could be considered state champions de facto, if not de jure. A state-sanctioned tournament was held during the 1939–40, and 1940-41 seasons in Clarence, Missouri. However the advent of World War II and gas rationing caused their discontinuation. Regional girls basketball tournaments did not resume in Missouri until 1972.

Some information after 2007 is missing or waiting sources.

Championships

Number of Title Won By School

See also
 List of Missouri state high school boys basketball championships
 List of Missouri state high school girls volleyball championships
 List of Missouri state high school baseball champions
 List of Missouri state high school football champions
 List of Missouri high schools by athletic conferences

References

Cham
high school basketball
High school basketball competitions in the United States